Noelia Pérez Peñate (born 6 December 1972) is a former professional tennis player from Spain.

Biography
Pérez comes from Spain's Canary Islands and is the first person from the autonomous community to appear at grand slam level, having played at the Australian and US Open main draws.

In 1992 she featured in two doubles matches for the Spain Fed Cup team. Both matches, which Spain lost, were in dead rubbers, partnering Arantxa Sanchez Vicario against Belgium and Virginia Ruano Pascual in the quarter-final against Argentina. Spain finished the competition as runners-up.

Most of her appearances on tour came on the ITF circuit, but in 1993 she qualified for the doubles at Montpellier with Åsa Carlsson and the pair made the quarter-finals.

ITF finals

Singles (0–5)

Doubles (0–1)

See also
List of Spain Fed Cup team representatives

References

External links
 
 
 

1972 births
Living people
Spanish female tennis players
People from Gran Canaria
Sportspeople from the Province of Las Palmas